Andriy Yaroslavovych Melnychuk (born 14 November 1978) is a Ukrainian professional football manager and former player.

Career
In 1999 he made his debut for FC Bukovyna Chernivtsi.

At the Ukrainian Premier League Melnychuk debuted for FC Naftovyk Okhtyrka in 2007 playing only 6 games and losing in 5 of them. In 2010 he went abroad to the Uzbek League joining FC Qizilqum Zarafshon from the central Uzbekistan.

In 2016 he joined coaching staff of FC Stal Kamianske. In 2019 Melnychuk was appointed a manager of his home city club Bukovyna. In 2020-2022 he assisted in reestablishment of the historical Chernivtsi sports club Dovbush. In 2022 he again was appointed a manager of Bukovyna.

Honours
 Ukrainian Second League 
 champion: 2002–03 (Lukor Kalush), 2007–08 (Komunalnyk Luhansk), 2009–10 (Bukovyna Chernivtsi)

References

External links
 
 

1978 births
Living people
Sportspeople from Chernivtsi
Ukrainian footballers
Association football goalkeepers
FC Bukovyna Chernivtsi players
FC Oskil Kupyansk players
FC Sokil Zolochiv players
FC Spartak Ivano-Frankivsk players
FC Kalush players
FC Spartak Sumy players
FC Stal Kamianske players
FC Naftovyk-Ukrnafta Okhtyrka players
FC Komunalnyk Luhansk players
FC Qizilqum Zarafshon players
FK Dinamo Samarqand players
Ukrainian Premier League players
Ukrainian First League players
Ukrainian Second League players
Ukrainian Amateur Football Championship players
Ukrainian expatriate footballers
Expatriate footballers in Uzbekistan
Ukrainian expatriate sportspeople in Uzbekistan
Ukrainian football managers
FC Bukovyna Chernivtsi managers
Ukrainian First League managers